Giro del Trentino Alto Adige-Südtirol was a women's cycle race held in Italy, between 1994 and 2017. In all but three of its twenty-four editions, the race was held as a stage race.

Winners

Jerseys
 is worn by the overall leader of the race
 is worn by the leader of the mountain classification
 is worn by the leader of the points classification

References

External links

Cycle races in Italy
Recurring sporting events established in 1994
1994 establishments in Italy
Recurring sporting events disestablished in 2017
2017 disestablishments in Italy